John Coughlin (1837 to May 20, 1912) was an American soldier who fought in the American Civil War. Coughlin received the country's highest award for bravery during combat, the Medal of Honor, for his action at Swifts Creek in Virginia on 9 May 1864. He was honored with the award on 31 August 1893.

Biography
Coughlin was born in Williamstown, Vermont, in 1837. He was appointed as Lieutenant Colonel of the 10th New Hampshire Volunteer Infantry in September 1862, and mustered out with the regiment in June 1865.  He received a brevet (honorary promotion) to brigadier general dated 9 April 1865 for "gallant conduct in the field".

He died on 27 May 1912, and his remains are interred at the Arlington National Cemetery in Virginia.

Medal of Honor citation

See also

 List of American Civil War Medal of Honor recipients: A–F

References

1837 births
1912 deaths
People of New Hampshire in the American Civil War
Union Army officers
United States Army Medal of Honor recipients
American Civil War recipients of the Medal of Honor
People from Williamstown, Vermont
People of Vermont in the American Civil War
Burials at Arlington National Cemetery